Rodrigo Marcos dos Santos, better known as Rodrigo Mancha (born 16 June 1986 in Curitiba) is a Brazilian footballer, who last played as a defensive midfielder for Fortaleza.

Career
He started his career in the youth of Coritiba Foot Ball Club, where he played about 90 matches. Regarded as one of the biggest revelations of the team, was sought by several other teams, and in July 2009, was traded to the Saints Football Club. After the game against Gremio Cup semifinals by Brazil, where the Saints won 2-0 Fc to the entrance of Rodrigo Mancha in the field, with two errors that followed enabled the Guild to tie the game, the player was away and on 27 May 2010 loan was negotiated by the Grêmio Prudente. In January 2011, he moved on loan to Botafogo and on 25 May 2011 joined Vitória on loan.

Club statistics
(Correct )

Honours
Coritiba
Campeonato Brasileiro Série B: 2007
Campeonato Paranaense: 2008

Santos
Campeonato Paulista: 2010

Sport Recife
Copa do Nordeste: 2014

References

External links

 ogol
 soccerway
 IG Esporte

1986 births
Living people
Brazilian footballers
Brazilian expatriate footballers
Expatriate footballers in Japan
Campeonato Brasileiro Série A players
Campeonato Brasileiro Série B players
Campeonato Brasileiro Série C players
J1 League players
Coritiba Foot Ball Club players
Santos FC players
Botafogo de Futebol e Regatas players
Esporte Clube Vitória players
Oita Trinita players
Sport Club do Recife players
Fortaleza Esporte Clube players
Association football midfielders
Footballers from Curitiba